Karl Iagnemma (born October 19, 1972) is an American writer and research scientist. He is also the CEO of self-driving technology company Motional.

Background
Iagnemma was born in Shelby Township, Michigan, a suburb of Detroit. He studied mechanical engineering at the University of Michigan.

He received a PhD in mechanical engineering in 2001 from the Massachusetts Institute of Technology.

Career 
In 2013, Iagnemma founded NuTonomy. In October 2017, he sold the company to Delphi Automotive for $400 million.

Short fiction
Iagnemma has published a collection of short stories, On the Nature of Human Romantic Interaction (2003), which features many stories about the more human aspects of scientists/mathematicians,  where the protagonists are trapped between decisions of the heart and the rational way. His short stories have appeared in the Paris Review, Tin House, and Zoetrope, and have been anthologized in the Best American Short Stories and the Pushcart Prize collections.

He won the Paris Review Discovery Prize for his short story, On the Nature of Human Romantic Interaction - which is also the title short story of his 2003 debut short story collection - and was initially published in the Paris Review and reprinted in The Pushcart Prize 2003: Best of the Small Presses. Iagnemma additionally won the Paris Review Plimpton Prize in 2002. Iagnemma also won the Playboy College Fiction Contest for his short story, A Little Advance, published in the November 1998 issue of Playboy magazine (originally entitled Nativity). The On the Nature short story collection has been optioned by Warner Brothers.

Novels and Books
Iagnemma's first novel is entitled The Expeditions (2007), and concerns the story of an estranged father and his son’s voyages throughout the wilderness of 19th-century Michigan, specifically during the year 1844.

Iagnemma also has published a monograph on robotics from his research at MIT entitled Mobile Robots in Rough Terrain: Estimation, Motion Planning, and Control with Application to Planetary Rovers (2004).

Bibliography

Short Stories
A Little Advance (originally Nativity), November 1998, Playboy Magazine
Winner of the 1998 Playboy College Fiction Contest
On The Nature of Human Romantic Interaction, The Paris Review No. 157, Winter 2000.
Reprinted in The Pushcart Prize 2003: Best of the Small Presses
Recipient of the 2001 Paris Review Discovery Prize
The Confessional Approach, The Paris Review No, 160, Winter 2001.
Zilkowski's Theorem, Zoetrope: All-Story, Vol. 5, No. 3, Fall 2001.
Reprinted in Best American Short Stories 2002
The Phrenologist's Dream, Zoetrope: All-Story, Vol. 7, No. 1, Spring 2003.
The Indian Agent, Meridian, Issue 8, Fall/Winter 2001.
The Ore Miner's Wife, The Virginia Quarterly Review, Spring 2002.
Children of Hunger, One Story, Issue 18, March 30, 2003.
Kingdom, Order, Species, The Antioch Review, Spring 2003.

Short Story Collections
On The Nature of Human Romantic Interaction (2003)

Novels
The Expeditions (2007)

Non-fiction Books/Monographs
Mobile Robots in Rough Terrain: Estimation, Motion Planning, and Control with Application to Planetary Rovers (2004)

Awards
 Playboy College Fiction Contest (1998)
 Paris Review Plimpton Prize (2000)
 Paris Review Discovery Prize (2001)

External links
 Karl Iagnemma's Author Site
 Karl Iagnemma's Research Page
On the Nature of Being Karl Iagnemma - NOVA (PBS television science program)

References

1972 births
Living people
American people of Italian descent
University of Michigan College of Engineering alumni
MIT School of Engineering alumni
Writers from Michigan
People from Macomb County, Michigan